Corinne Vanier is a former professional tennis player who won the 1981 French Open Girls' doubles championship with Sophie Amiach and played on the WTA tour.

Life and career
Corinne Vanier was born in France on 20 September 1963. She played in Tennis Club de Paris and for France in 1981 Federation Cup.

Doubles (0–2)

References

External links
 
 
 

French female tennis players
Living people
1963 births
Grand Slam (tennis) champions in girls' doubles
French Open junior champions